Verna Charlene Stavely, professionally known as Charlene Holt, (April 28, 1928 – April 5, 1996) was an American actress known for her supporting roles in television and film.

Early life
Holt was born on April 28, 1928, in Snyder, Texas, to Malcolm C. and Verna Vesta Stavely, née Chandler. After she graduated from high school in Hagerman, New Mexico, she attended McMurry University in Abilene, Texas. She was a model in Houston, Texas. 

In 1956, Holt was crowned Miss Maryland and in July 1956 participated in the Miss USA pageant in Long Beach, California where she was a semi-finalist. In August 1957 she was among nine models sent to Rio de Janeiro, Brazil, by Rose Marie Reid Swim Suits of Los Angeles and the Eileen Ford Agency in New York City. 

Holt appeared in various TV commercials in 1958 and reportedly signed a $50,000-a-year modeling contract in New York at age 19. She was in a Revlon lipstick commercial, in which she was reportedly spotted by director Howard Hawks, who later cast her in several of his films, including Man's Favorite Sport and El Dorado. She was subsequently named "Miss Sweater Girl" in October 1958 by the Wool Bureau. The contest was held in the Crystal Suite of the Savoy Hilton Hotel in New York.

Career
Holt's first credited role was as Lisa, a model, in If a Man Answers, a 1962 comedy film directed by Henry Levin and starring Bobby Darin and Sandra Dee.

Personal life
 
Holt married William A. Tishman, a millionaire builder in Los Angeles on October 7, 1966. They resided in Beverly Hills' Trousdale Estates until their divorce in June 1972.

Holt died on April 5, 1996, in Williamson County, Tennessee. She was 67.

Filmography

 Target: The Corruptors (1962, TV Series)
 If a Man Answers (1962) – Lisa, Model
 Hawaiian Eye (1962, TV Series) – Evelyn Mason
 Saints and Sinners (1962, TV Series) – Woman Correspondent
 Days of Wine and Roses (1962) – Guest (uncredited)
 Island of Love (1963) – (uncredited)
 The Alfred Hitchcock Hour (1963, TV Series) – Darlene Vance
 Burke's Law (1963–1964, TV Series) – Cecily Channing / Christy
 Man's Favorite Sport? (1964) – Tex Connors
 Arrest and Trial (1964, TV Series) – Fay Carlson
 Perry Mason (1965, TV Series) – Helen Cadmus
 Red Line 7000 (1965) – Lindy
 Honey West (1965, TV Series) – Gloria
 The Hero (1966, TV Series) – Angie
 El Dorado (1966) – Maudie
 Hour of the Gun (1967) – Wife of Harry, the Barber (uncredited)
 It Takes a Thief (1968, TV Series) – Tracey Lewis / Miss Spencer
 Zigzag (1970) – Sara Raymond
 Wonder Woman (1974, TV Movie) – Hippolyte
 Police Story (1975, TV Series) – Maggie
 Melvin and Howard (1980) – Mrs. Worth
 CHiPs (1980, TV Series) – Herself (uncredited) (final appearance)

References

External links
 

1928 births
Actresses from Texas
American film actresses
American television actresses
1996 deaths
People from Snyder, Texas
20th-century American actresses